Philosophy of design is the study of definitions of design, and the assumptions, foundations, and implications of design.  The field, which is mostly a sub-discipline of aesthetics, is defined by an interest in a set of problems, or an interest in central or foundational concerns in design.  In addition to these central problems for design as a whole, many philosophers of design consider these problems as they apply to particular disciplines (e.g. philosophy of art).  Although most practitioners are philosophers of aesthetics (i.e., aestheticians), several prominent designers and artists have contributed to the field. For an introduction to the philosophy of design see the article by Per Galle at the Royal Danish Academy.

Notable philosophers and theorists 
Philosophers of design, or philosophers relevant to the philosophical study of design:

References

Philosophy of technology
Design studies
Science and technology studies
Media studies
D
Design